Liesveld  may refer to:

 Liesveld (former municipality), a former municipality of South Holland, since 2013 part of the new municipality of Molenwaard
 Liesveld (hamlet), a hamlet in the municipality of Molenwaard
 Liesveld (polder), a polder and former water board in the municipality of Molenwaard